Health Communication Network (HCN), trading as MedicalDirector, is a company headquartered in Sydney, with offices located in Bundaberg and Melbourne.

Private equity firm Affinity Equity Partners acquired the company for AU$155 million on 30 March 2016 from HCN's then owner Primary Health Care Limited.

MedicalDirector is a provider of electronic health records, patient management, billing, scheduling, care coordination, medicines information, clinical content and population health management services for general practitioners and specialists in the health care industry. MedicalDirector employs about 230 people.

MedicalDirector's annual turnover is approximately AU$65 million.

References

External links
Official site

Electronic health record software companies
Software companies of Australia
Health communication